The following is a list of the 319 communes of the French department of Lot-et-Garonne.

The communes cooperate in the following intercommunalities (as of 2022):
CA Agglomération d'Agen
Communauté d'agglomération du Grand Villeneuvois
CA Val de Garonne Agglomération
Communauté de communes Albret Communauté
Communauté de communes des Bastides en Haut Agenais Périgord
Communauté de communes du Confluent et des Coteaux de Prayssas
Communauté de communes des Coteaux et Landes de Gascogne
Communauté de communes des Deux Rives (partly)
Communauté de communes Fumel Vallée du Lot
Communauté de communes Lot et Tolzac
Communauté de communes du Pays de Duras
Communauté de communes du Pays de Lauzun

References

Lot-et-Garonne